The Stouts Mill Bridge is a historic camelback through truss bridge that brings Duskcamp Rd. over Little Kanawha River in Stouts Mill, Gilmer County, West Virginia. The bridge was built in 1897.  It was designed and/or built by the Canton Bridge Company.

It was listed on the National Register of Historic Places in 1998.

References

Road bridges on the National Register of Historic Places in West Virginia
Bridges completed in 1897
Buildings and structures in Gilmer County, West Virginia
Transportation in Gilmer County, West Virginia
National Register of Historic Places in Gilmer County, West Virginia
Parker truss bridges in the United States
Metal bridges in the United States